NL63-related bat coronavirus strain BtKYNL63-9b is a species of coronavirus in the genus Alphacoronavirus.

References

Alphacoronaviruses